Oikonomos Football Club is a Greek football club, based in Tsaritsani, Larissa regional unit. The association was founded in 1953.

In 2011, they were promoted to the Football League 2 for the first time in history after becoming champions of the 2010–11 Delta Ethniki.

Honours

Domestic

 Delta Ethniki champions: 1
 2010–11
 Larissa FCA Champions: 2
 2009–10, 2017–18
 Larissa FCA Cup Winners: 1
 2017–18

References

External links
Official website 

Football clubs in Thessaly
1953 establishments in Greece
Larissa (regional unit)